Justin Lewis Bannan (born April 18, 1979) is a former American football defensive tackle. He was drafted by the Buffalo Bills in the fifth round of the 2002 NFL Draft. He played college football at Colorado.

Bannan also played for the Baltimore Ravens, Denver Broncos, St. Louis Rams, and Detroit Lions.

In 2019, he shot a woman in the shoulder, after being startled while hiding in a building suite before operating hours from what he believed was the Russian maffia due to paranoia symptoms stemming from Chronic Traumatic Encephalopathy (CTE) 
On February 10, 2022, he was sentenced to 16 years in prison for attempted murder without any evidence being allowed to be presented on his concussion history, medically established brain injury from his time in the NFL, or testimony from neurologists or CTE experts.

Early years
Bannan graduated from Bella Vista High School in Fair Oaks, California, in 1997 and was a letterman in football and basketball.

Professional career

Buffalo Bills
Bannan was drafted by the Buffalo Bills in the fifth round (139th overall) of the 2002 NFL Draft and played for them through the 2005 season.

Baltimore Ravens
Bannan joined the Baltimore Ravens before the 2006 season and played for them until 2009. In the 2008 season, he set a personal-best with 30 solo tackles (56 total), one sack and one interception.

Denver Broncos
On March 5, 2010, Bannan signed a five-year contract with the Denver Broncos.

On March 3, 2011, the Broncos released Bannan.

St. Louis Rams
Bannan signed with the St. Louis Rams on July 30, 2011. He was released following the 2011 season on March 12, 2012.

Denver Broncos (second stint)
On April 11, 2012, Bannan signed a one-year deal with the Denver Broncos.

Detroit Lions
On August 15, 2013, Bannan signed a contract with the Detroit Lions.  Bannan was released from the Lions as of September 25, 2013.

Personal life
Bannan has an interest in stocks and bonds, and appeared on Jim Cramer's Mad Money television show on October 31, 2007.

On October 17, 2019, Bannan was arrested in connection to a shooting that took place at Black Lab Sports in Boulder, Colorado, that left one woman injured. Bannan was charged with attempted first-degree murder, assault and burglary for the shooting. On February 10, 2022, he was sentenced to 16 years in prison.

References

External links

Baltimore Ravens bio
Denver Broncos bio

1979 births
Living people
Players of American football from Sacramento, California
American football defensive tackles
American football defensive ends
Colorado Buffaloes football players
Buffalo Bills players
Baltimore Ravens players
Denver Broncos players
St. Louis Rams players
Detroit Lions players